The ninth series of the British semi-reality television programme The Only Way Is Essex began airing on 2 June 2013 and included the 100th episode of the series which aired 12 June 2013. This was the first series not to feature both Mick Norcross and Debbie Douglas after their departure from the show during the previous series although Douglas made a cameo appearance in Episode 11. Both appeared in the show from series 2–8. It was also the first series not to include Kirk Norcross since he returned to the cast in series 7. On 12 April 2013, ahead of series, Lucy Mecklenburgh announced on Twitter that her relationship with Mario Falcone had ended. The series began with two The Only Way Is Marbs specials.

Cast

Episodes

{| class="wikitable plainrowheaders" style="width:100%; background:white;"
|- style="color:black"
! style="background:#F66E2F;"| Seriesno.
! style="background:#F66E2F;"| Episodeno.
! style="background:#F66E2F;"| Title
! style="background:#F66E2F;"| Original airdate
! style="background:#F66E2F;"| Duration
! style="background:#F66E2F;"| UK viewers

|}

Reception

Ratings

References

The Only Way Is Essex
2013 in British television
2013 British television seasons